The 2021–22 Townsville Fire season is the 21st season for the franchise in the Women's National Basketball League (WNBL).

James Cook University remain as the Fire's naming rights partner after signing a three-year extension in September 2019. Mia Murray & Lauren Nicholson were named as Co-Captains for the 2021–22 season.

Roster

Standings

Results

Regular season

References

External links
Townsville Fire Official website

2021–22 WNBL season
WNBL seasons by team
Basketball,Townsville Fire
2021 in basketball
2021 in women's basketball
2021–22 in Australian basketball